is a Japanese footballer currently playing as a midfielder for Ehime.

Club career
Kiyokawa made his professional debut on 3 July 2019 in an Emperor's Cup game against Tokushima Vortis.

Career statistics

Club
.

Notes

References

External links

1996 births
Living people
Japanese footballers
Association football midfielders
Ehime FC players